Bunge & Born was a multinational corporation based in Buenos Aires, Argentina, whose diverse interests included food processing and international trade in grains and oilseeds. It is now known as Bunge Limited.

History

Bunge & Born was founded in 1884 by Ernesto Bunge, a German Argentine whose uncle, Carl Bunge, had been Consul General in Argentina for both the Netherlands and Prussia, and his brother-in-law, Jorge Born, who had recently arrived from Antwerp. The company superseded the Bunge Company founded in Amsterdam by Johann Bunge, in 1818. They had one of the largest wheat mills in the country built on a Puerto Madero lot in 1902, and with it, established Molinos Río de la Plata (later a leader in the local retail foods market).

The company started Argentina's first burlap bag manufacturer, following which they successfully lobbied government policy makers for protective tariffs on the then-critical commercial staple. They established a mortgage bank, the Banco Hipotecario Franco Argentino, and a subsidiary in Brazil in 1905, and by 1910, they reportedly controlled 80% of Argentine cereal exports (Argentina was, by then, the world's third-largest grain exporter).<ref>Rock, David. Argentina: 1516-1982. University of California Press, 1987. p.172</ref>  They later established paint manufacturer Alba (1925), chemical and fertilizer maker Compañía Química, and textile maker Grafa (1932), among others; by the late 1920s, the company's annual export receipts alone reached US$300 million.INDEC: Comercio exterior  The company inaugurated its neo-gothic Buenos Aires headquarters on Leandro Alem Avenue, designed by local architect Pablo Naeff, in 1926.

Bunge & Born's near-monopoly on cereal and flour exports ended with populist President Juan Perón's 1946 establishment of the IAPI, a state agricultural purchasing and export agent. The company responded by extending its reach into the country fast-growing retail processed foods market, and though its prominence as the nation's chief exporter was partly restored by Perón's 1955 ousting and the IAPI's liquidation, its focus remained domestic over the next three decades. A privately held company, Bunge & Born did not release periodical financial statements, though it did report US$2bn in gross receipts in 1962; by then it had become a leader in commodity futures trading, operating 110 offices worldwide.

The Bunge, Born, Hirsch, Engels and De La Tour families remained the company's chief stock-holders, and by extension, leaders in the domestic textile, paint, chemical, fertilizer, and food processing industries. On September 19, 1974, however, the consortium was shaken by the kidnapping of siblings Jorge and Juan Born by the far-left terrorist group, Montoneros. The Born brothers were kept in a known Argentine State Intelligence safehouse for nine months until their June 1975 release, something made possible without public suspicion of outside involvement by the agency's numerous contacts inside the Montoneros (including the leader, Mario Firmenich). Freed for a US$60 million ransom (the largest on record at that time), the ordeal triggered the company headquarters' relocation to São Paulo, Brazil, and contributed to the March 1976 coup.

Retaining their Argentine interests (44 companies, by the 1980s), the families continued to suffer from ongoing disputes, and in 1987, CEO Mario Hirsch died suddenly. The election of Carlos Menem to the Argentine Presidency in May 1989, however, resulted in an agreement between the President-elect and Jorge Born that gave the company partial control over national economic policy. Bunge & Born provided the Menem government with its first two economy ministers, and the combination of large rate increases on public services (around 500%), a simplified exchange rate and a massive, mandatory wage hike led to a sharp economic turnaround between July and November 1989. This foray into government policy making, however, ended in a new currency crisis that December and the failure (compounded by the company's lackluster business performance) resulted in Born's 1991 ouster from the board; he was replaced by Chief Operations Officer Octavio Caraballo.

Beset by the rift between Jorge Born and his brother, Juan, the prior unity between the shareholders disintegrated as Caraballo struggled to modernize the company. Family frictions intensified when Jorge Born formed a business partnership with one of his former kidnappers, erstwhile Montonero strategist Rodolfo Galimberti.

Bunge International
The company was converted into the Bermuda-registered Bunge International in 1994, retaining the Bunge y Born name only in Argentina. Bunge remained a privately held company of 180 shareholders (including the longtime controlling family interests) and divested itself in 1998, of almost all its retail foods interests in favor of a greater role in international agribusiness and commodity markets; by then the company's gross annual turnover had reached US$13 billion. Bunge ultimately went public on the NYSE in 2001, becoming Bunge Limited''.

References

 
Conglomerate companies established in 1884
1884 establishments in Argentina
Conglomerate companies of Argentina